The 1996 Sheffield Eagles season was the 13th season in the club's rugby league history and the first season in the Super League. Coached by Gary Hetherington, the Eagles competed in Super League I and finished in 7th place. The club also reached the fifth round of the Challenge Cup.

Table

Squad
Statistics include appearances and points in the Super League and Challenge Cup.

References

External links
Sheffield Eagles - Rugby League Project

Sheffield Eagles
Sheffield Eagles
English rugby league club seasons